Niklas Sauter (born 6 April 2003) is a German professional footballer who plays as a goalkeeper for SC Freiburg II.

Club career
Sauter grew up in Konstanz and joined SC Freiburg from SC Konstanz-Wollmatingen in 2016. Having come through Freiburg's youth ranks, he became part of SC Freiburg II's squad in 2021.

International career
Sauter has represented Germany at youth international level.

Career statistics

Club

References

2003 births
Living people
German footballers
Association football goalkeepers
Germany youth international footballers
3. Liga players
SC Freiburg players
SC Freiburg II players